Beizaoxian Township is a township of Zhengding County, Hebei, China, located around  northwest of the county seat. , it had 19 villages under its administration.

See also
List of township-level divisions of Hebei

References

Township-level divisions of Hebei